Operation Long Arm was the first internet child pornography crackdown recorded in the United States, and involved the United States Customs Service along with Danish law enforcement. It resulted in 34 arrests and convictions in the US and 2 in Australia.

Overview 
In early 1992, a tip-off from the arrest in Miami of an individual trying to buy a child pornography VHS cassette from an undercover police, led to the discovery of a Bulletin board system based in Denmark called Bamse. The network operated with a $80 annually pay fee or the supply of child-porn images in exchange. At the moment of the shutdown it had a peak of 900 active users ranging from countries like the United States, Denmark and Australia.

References 

Child pornography crackdowns
Cybercrime in Australia
Cybercrime in the United States
1992 crimes in Australia
1992 crimes in the United States
Cybercrime in Denmark
Bulletin board systems